María Candela Vetrano Vega (born August 9, 1991 in Lomas de Zamora, Buenos Aires, Argentina) better known as Candela Vetrano is an Argentine actress, model and fashion designer.

Biography 
María Candela Vetrano was born on August 9, 1991 in Lomas de Zamora, Buenos Aires, Argentina. She is the daughter of Héctor Vetrano and María Victoria Vega. She has one brother and two sisters.

Career 
Candela Vetrano began her artistic career from a young age, performing studies of singing, theater, musical comedy and dance, being Agrandadytos her first participation in television. In 2003, she made her acting debut playing Estrella in the series Rincón de luz. In 2006, she was part of the cast of the youth television series Chiquititas Sin Fin, playing the character of Valeria San Simón. From 2007 to 2010, she was part of the cast of the youth television series Casi Ángeles, Candela Vetrano played the co-starring role of Estefanía Elordi Rinaldi. Candela Vetrano was the protagonist of the co-production between Disney Channel Latin America and Utopia, who work in collaboration with Telefe for the series Supertorpe which it was recorded since the beginning of 2011 and it was premiered on July 18, 2011. Candela Vetrano played the role of "Poly Truper". The series ended after 2 seasons in May 2012. In January 2013, Candela Vetrano is summoned by the producer Sebastián Ortega to be the youth protagonist of a new television fiction called Los Vecinos en Guerra. In 2014 to 2015, Candela Vetrano played the role of Milagros "Mili" Villa in the Pol-ka series Noche y día by Canal 13. In 2017 she is part of the cast of Cuéntame cómo pasó by TV Pública. In 2019, she was part of the cast of the television series Argentina, tierra de amor y venganza.

Other Work 
In 2002 Candela Vetrano began her career as a model for Mimo & Co. In January 2013, Candela Vetrano launched her own clothing line, which she called Hey! Mona and that is directed towards teenage girls. Its main sales mechanism is online, through its website.

Personal life 
From 2008 to 2010, Vetrano was in a relationship with the actor Agustín Sierra. She then dated Lucas Minuto from 2011 to 2012, and actor Gastón Soffritti from 2013 to 2014. Since 2016, she has been in a relationship with actor Andrés Gil.

Filmography

Television

Theater

Television Programs

Movies

Discography

Soundtrack albums 
 2003 — Rincon de Luz
 2006 — Chiquititas Vol. 8
 2008 — Casi Ángeles
 2009 — Casi Ángeles
 2010 — Casi Ángeles
 2011 — Supertorpe

Awards and nominations

References

External links 
 https://www.youtube.com/watch?v=NSdsJMESxAM (Candela Vetrano song: "Tu canción" / Casi Ángeles).
 https://www.youtube.com/watch?v=yIGf8Uyahmo (Candela Vetrano, Mariana Espósito, María Eugenia Suárez and Agustin Sierra in Rincón de Luz 2003).
 https://www.youtube.com/watch?v=lnuz63gd1dw (Candela Vetrano, Lali Espósito and Eugenia Suárez in Casi Ángeles 2008)
 https://www.youtube.com/watch?v=jp8OSnerFz0 (Candela Vetrano VIDEO: "Mirame" /soundtrack Super Torpe 2011).
 https://www.youtube.com/watch?v=HALr1I2w7aE (Candela Vetrano VIDEO: "Por vos" / soundtrack Super Torpe 2011).

1991 births
21st-century Argentine women singers
Argentine stage actresses
Argentine telenovela actresses
Argentine television actresses
Living people
Actresses from Buenos Aires
People from Lomas de Zamora